The Srikakulam Urban Development Authority is an urban planning agency in Srikakulam district of the Indian state of Andhra Pradesh. It was constituted on 12 February 2019, under Andhra Pradesh Metropolitan Region and Urban Development Authorities Act, 2016 with the headquarters located at Srikakulam.

Jurisdiction 
It covers 1264 villages in 28 mandals of Srikakulam district. The below table lists the urban areas of SUDA.

References 

Srikakulam district
Urban development authorities of Andhra Pradesh
State urban development authorities of India